

Steam Classes

Diesel Types

US locomotive types
US locomotive types